Endeavors, formerly known as Family Endeavors,  is a non-profit organization that provides programs and services towards community, disaster relief, employment, housing, mental health, and veteran family services in the United States.

History and organization

Urban Ministries (1969 - 2007)
In 1969, several of San Antonio’s inner-city churches banded together to launch “Urban Ministries,” and initiated programs such as food bank and housing for seniors and runaway youths. In 1977, the scope of housing programs was expanded to include individuals with mental illness. In 1992, employment programs were initiated for those with disabilities. In 1995, after school programs for youth were launched.

Rebranding and continued expansion (2007 - Present)

In 2007, Urban Ministries was rebranded initially as San Antonio Family Endeavors with the scope of the organization covering supportive housing, job training, employment, case management, homeless prevention, group and individual counseling, and youth development services. As the organization expanded their services nationally the name was shortened to Family Endeavors in 2013 and then to just Endeavors in 2018.

Since 2011, Endeavors has been receiving federal funding in an effort to end veteran homelessness. Federal funding of 4 million dollars was renewed again by congressman Joaquin Castro in 2016. On May 20, 2016, Family Endeavors expanded their mental health services by formally opening their first of three mental health clinic which operate under the banner of Steven A. Cohen Military Family Clinic operating from within their San Antonio office. The second Military family Clinic was opened in El Paso and the third in Killeen on July 15, 2017 and May 15, 2018 respectively. In addition, to in house care the Cohen Clinics also provide online video counseling services.

Services

Children and youth services
Children and youth services include on demand case management, clinical and social work and direct care that staff provides on a national scope to evacuation centers, foster homes, corporations, community centers and families.

Employment
Employment services are provided under the Endeavors Unlimited label for individuals with disabilities specifically Commercial Grounds Maintenance and Custodial Services.

Housing programs
Housing Programs are the longest running program from Endeavors with a goal of providing permanent supportive housing to individuals and families with mental illness, disabilities, and female Veterans. They follow the Fairweather Lodge model with case management, professional counseling, life skills training, and employment opportunities.

The most notable institution are the Fairweather Lodge/ Family Fairweather lodge located in Bexar county, San Antonio, Texas. Additional homelessness prevention programs for veterans are present in Comberville County and Fayetville, North Carolina.

Mental health

Steven A. Cohen Military Family Clinics operate in San Antonio, El Paso and Killeen. In addition, to onsite care for veterans telehealth services in the form of online face to face therapy services our available to post 9/11 veterans.

Collaborators

References

External links
 Official Site
 Employment Program for Disabled 
 Financial Statement
 PTSD Case Study
 Endeavors Veteran Service Case Study

Child welfare
Child welfare in the United States
Child abuse in the United States
Disability organizations based in the United States
Disability law advocacy groups in the United States
Mental health organizations in the United States
Organizations established in 1969
Psychiatric rehabilitation
Family and Protective Services, Texas Department of
Volunteer organizations in the United States